David A. Legwand (born August 17, 1980) is an American former professional ice hockey forward who played 16 seasons in the National Hockey League (NHL). He was the first player ever drafted by the Nashville Predators, with whom he spent 12 full seasons and set several franchise records. He finished the final three seasons of his career split between the Predators, Detroit Red Wings, Ottawa Senators and Buffalo Sabres.

Playing career

Amateur
Legwand attended Grosse Pointe North High School. As a youth, he played in the 1993 and 1994 Quebec International Pee-Wee Hockey Tournaments with the Detroit Little Caesars minor ice hockey team.

He played his junior career with the Plymouth Whalers of the OHL. In the season before he was drafted, he scored 54 goals along with 51 assists, totaling 105 points. He also won the Red Tilson Award as the most outstanding player in the league.

Nashville Predators

Legwand was drafted 2nd overall by the Nashville Predators in 1998 NHL Entry Draft, behind Vincent Lecavalier. He was briefly called up late in the team's inaugural season, making his debut in the final game of the season, and spent most of his NHL career with the Predators. He currently holds many franchise records for the Predators, including most games played and assists.

During the NHL 2004–05 lockout season, Legwand played for the Swiss team EHC Basel.

Legwand became the first NHL player to score on a penalty shot in overtime on December 23, 2000 against the New York Rangers.

 After several first round playoff exits, Legwand and the Predators advanced to the second round for the first time in franchise history and his career in 2011. The Predators were defeated by the eventual Western Conference Champions Vancouver Canucks in six games.

On March 5, 2014, in the final year of his contract with the Predators and out of playoff contention, Legwand was traded to the Detroit Red Wings for Patrick Eaves, Calle Järnkrok, and a conditional 2014 draft pick, ending his 15-year career in Nashville. He left Nashville as the franchise's all-time leader in all offensive categories and games played, with 956 appearances.  As a result of the trade Legwand gained the uncommon distinction of playing 83 games in the normally 82 game NHL season.

Later years
On July 4, 2014, Legwand signed a two-year, $6 million free agent contract with the Ottawa Senators. The move came after the Senators traded star center Jason Spezza to the Dallas Stars. In his only season in Ottawa in 2014-15 season, Legwand added a veteran presence in helping return the Senators to the playoffs, however suffered a decline in production with 9 goals and 27 points in 80 games.

On June 26, 2015, Legwand was traded to the Buffalo Sabres along with Senators teammate Robin Lehner in exchange for the New York Islanders' 1st-round pick in the 2015 NHL Entry Draft.

Legwand announced his retirement from professional hockey on December 22, 2016.

Personal life
Legwand and his wife, Lindsey, have two children, with the firstborn being a son born on November 21, 2009.

In January 2015, Legwand, along with former NHL player Derian Hatcher, entered an agreement to purchase the Sarnia Sting of the Ontario Hockey League (OHL).  The transfer of ownership was approved by the OHL Board of Governors and completed on March 4, 2015.

Records and milestones
Nashville Predators record for most games played (956)
Nashville Predators record for most points (566)

Career statistics

Regular season and playoffs

International

References

External links

1980 births
Living people
American men's ice hockey centers
EHC Basel players
Buffalo Sabres players
Detroit Red Wings players
Ice hockey people from Detroit
Milwaukee Admirals players
Nashville Predators draft picks
Nashville Predators players
National Hockey League first-round draft picks
Ottawa Senators players
Plymouth Whalers players